Lepidophyma lipetzi, Lipetz's tropical night lizard, is a species of lizard in the family Xantusiidae. It is a small lizard found in Mexico.

References

Lepidophyma
Endemic reptiles of Mexico
Natural history of Chiapas
Reptiles described in 1977
Taxa named by Hobart Muir Smith